Cho Hanseung (born November 27, 1982), also known as Jo Hanseung is a professional go player.

Biography 
Cho turned professional in 1995. He was promoted to 7 dan in 2004, 8 dan in 2005 and 9 dan in 2006.

Titles and runners-up 

Total: 5 titles, 11 runners-up.

External links
GoBase profile
Sensei's Library profile

1982 births
Living people
South Korean Go players
Asian Games medalists in go
Go players at the 2010 Asian Games
Asian Games gold medalists for South Korea
Medalists at the 2010 Asian Games